António Horta Osório may refer to: 

António Lino de Sousa Horta Osório (born 1933), lawyer and sportsman, father of 
Sir António Horta-Osório (banker) (born 1964), banker and businessman, son of the above